The Palladium  is a 35-floor mixed use residential and office tower in Jumeirah Lake Towers in Dubai, United Arab Emirates. The tower has a total structural height of 140 m (459 ft). Construction of the Palladium was completed in 2007.

See also 
 List of buildings in Dubai

External links
Emporis

Residential skyscrapers in Dubai
Buildings and structures completed in 2007
Skyscraper office buildings in Dubai